These Are the Facts is the second album by the Sheffield band Milburn. The album was released on 24 September 2007 in the UK on Mercury Records.

Track listing

References

2007 albums
Milburn (band) albums
Mercury Records albums
Albums recorded at Elevator Studios